Plagiopetalum is a genus of flowering plants belonging to the family Melastomataceae.

Its native range is Assam to Southern China and Indo-China.

Species:

Plagiopetalum esquirolii 
Plagiopetalum serratum 
Plagiopetalum tenuicaule

References

Melastomataceae
Melastomataceae genera